Corban Joel Wroe (born 30 September 1992) is an Australian basketball player for the Warwick Senators of the NBL1 West. He played four seasons of college basketball in the United States for the Hartford Hawks before spending two seasons as a development player with the Perth Wildcats of the National Basketball League (NBL). Early in his career, he was compared to fellow former Perth Wildcats guard Brad Robbins.

Early life and career
Born in Townsville, Queensland, Wroe moved to Brisbane as a youth and spent 2005 to 2008 attending Southern Cross Catholic College. He played for various Brisbane Capitals under-age teams and represented Queensland South at the 2007 Australian U16 Championships. He also helped the Australian Emus win the 2008 FIBA Oceania Youth Tournament.

In 2009, Wroe moved to Canberra after earning a scholarship to attend the Australian Institute of Sport (AIS) and Lake Ginninderra Secondary College. He helped Australia win gold at the Australian Youth Olympic Festival early in the year and later represented Queensland South at the Australian U18 Championships. He also played eight games for the AIS SEABL team, averaging 4.4 points and 1.8 rebounds per game. In December, he represented Lake Ginninderra at the Australian Schools Championships.

In 2010, Wroe earned his second gold medal with the Emus after the team won the Albert Schweitzer Tournament. He later helped the Emus go 7–2 on their China tour. He attended a team camp in August in preparation for the FIBA Oceania U18 Championship, but he did not make the final squad. With the AIS SEABL team in 2010, Wroe averaged 2.7 points, 1.3 rebounds and 2.1 assists in 12 games. He also represented Queensland at the Australian U20 Championships and was named the 2010 Junior Male Player of the Year by Basketball Queensland. In addition, Wroe also participated in the 2009 Nike All-Asia Camp and the 2010 Nike Global Challenge.

Wroe spent one more year at the AIS in 2011 and was part of the Emus' training camp squad preparing for the 2011 FIBA Under-19 World Championship. He signed a national letter of intent with the University of Hartford in the United States to play for coach John Gallagher and the Hawks in the 2011–12 season.

College career

Freshman year
Wroe came into Hartford as just the second Hawk in program history to hail from Australia. Entering his freshman year, he was described by coach John Gallagher as a tough defender who could be relied upon to disrupt the opponent's offensive flow. His maturity and awareness on the offensive end made him a natural leader on the court at the guard position. He played in 31 games for the Hawks in 2011–12, making three starts and averaging 1.6 points and 1.4 rebounds in 9.9 minutes per game. In just his third college game, he scored a season-high 10 points against Mount St. Mary's. He was named to the America East Commissioner's Honor Roll for achieving a grade point average of 3.5 or greater.

Sophomore year
Wroe's maturity and leadership shown during his freshman year earned him co-captain honours for the 2012–13 season. He was one of three players to start and play in all 31 games in 2012–13, as he averaged 2.8 points and 2.1 rebounds in 19.2 minutes per game. He scored a season-high 8 points on 16 February 2013 against Albany. For the second year in a row, he was named to the America East Commissioner's Honor Roll for achieving a grade point average of 3.5 or greater.

Junior year
As a junior in 2013–14, Wroe earned America East All-Defensive Team honours and was named to the All-Academic Team. He was also one of 10 NCAA men's basketball players to receive a Division I-AAA Athletics Directors Association Scholar-Athlete award. As team co-captain for a second season, Wroe was one of two players to start and play in all 33 games. He averaged career-best numbers in scoring (6.3 ppg), rebounding (3.2 rpg) and minutes (25.3 mpg), while his 57 total assists were a career-high and ranked third on the team. He scored a career-high 21 points on two occasions, recording the mark in two of the final three games of the season. His 21 points against Stony Brook in the season finale all came from three-pointers, hitting 7-of-9 on the night. His academic prowess was recognised again, earning America East Commissioner's Honor Roll honours for a third time for achieving a grade point average of 3.5 or higher.

Senior year
As a senior in 2014–15, Wroe earned America East All-Defensive Team and All-Academic Team honours for a second straight year. He became the first player in program history to earn two America East All-Defensive Team nominations. He significantly stepped up his three-point game during his senior season. Combining to make just 33 threes over his first three seasons, he converted from long range 49 times in his final season to finish eighth among America East leaders in threes per game. Wroe put up solid numbers on both ends of the court in 2014–15, as he ranked second in scoring with 9.9 points per game while adding 4.1 rebounds per game, 2.4 assists per game and a team-leading 41 steals. On 19 January 2015, Wroe scored a career-high 23 points in a 65–63 win over UMBC.

Wroe graduated from Hartford with a long list of academic accomplishments and a degree in health sciences. Earning America East Commissioner's Honor Roll laurels all four years for achieving a grade point average of 3.5 or higher, he became the second player in program history to earn repeat America East All-Academic Team honors. In addition, Wroe capped off his career by becoming Hartford's first-ever repeat Division I AAA Scholar-Athlete Team member, as he received the accolade in both 2014 and 2015. In preparation for leaving college, Wroe signed with Mummu Athlete Management.

College statistics

|-
| style="text-align:left;"| 2011–12
| style="text-align:left;"| Hartford
| 31 || 3 || 9.9 || .472 || .200 || .625 || 1.4 || .5 || .4 || .0 || 1.6
|-
| style="text-align:left;"| 2012–13
| style="text-align:left;"| Hartford
| 31 || 31 || 19.2 || .542 || .250 || .792 || 2.1 || 1.1 || .9 || .1 || 2.8
|-
| style="text-align:left;"| 2013–14
| style="text-align:left;"| Hartford
| 33 || 33 || 25.3 || .486 || .433 || .800 || 3.2 || 1.7 || .6 || .1 || 6.3
|-
| style="text-align:left;"| 2014–15
| style="text-align:left;"| Hartford
| 30 || 29 || 34.5 || .462 || .358 || .750 || 4.1 || 2.4 || 1.4 || .1 || 9.9
|-
| style="text-align:center;" colspan="2"|Career
| 125 || 96 || 22.2 || .480 || .371 || .752 || 2.7 || 1.4 || .8 || .1 || 5.1
|-

Professional career

Townsville Heat and Melbourne United (2015)
In May 2015, Wroe joined the Townsville Heat of the Queensland Basketball League (QBL). In eight games during the 2015 season, he averaged 12.5 points, 6.4 rebounds and 3.3 assists per game. In July 2015, he moved to Melbourne to train for two weeks with NBL club Melbourne United before touring with them in China for a week, given the Victorian side were to be without a string of first choice players.

Perth Wildcats (2015–2017)

On 4 September 2015, Wroe signed with the Perth Wildcats as a development player for the 2015–16 NBL season. He made his NBL debut on 10 October, recording two assists and one rebound in two and a half minutes in a 79–66 win over the Adelaide 36ers. He saw an increase in minutes later that month and into November due to an injury to Damian Martin. He saw extended minutes late in the season as well due to injuries. The Wildcats finished the regular season in second place with an 18–10 record. They defeated the Illawarra Hawks 2–1 in the semi-finals and then took out the championship with a 2–1 victory over the New Zealand Breakers in the grand final series. He appeared in 19 of the team's 34 games in 2015–16, recording totals of 17 points and 15 assists.

Returning to the Wildcats as a development player for the 2016–17 NBL season, Wroe was once again thrust into the line-up early in the season due to injuries to Damian Martin and Jarrod Kenny. He made his season debut for the Wildcats on 28 October against the Illawarra Hawks in Wollongong. In 29 minutes as a starter, he recorded two points, two rebounds and one assist in an 81–76 loss. Martin returned to action for the Wildcats in the following game against the Adelaide 36ers in Perth on 5 November, but sustained another injury mid-game, which led to Wroe playing extended minutes off the bench. In 22 minutes, he recorded five points, five rebounds, four assists and one steal in a 106–103 win. He started for the Wildcats in their next game against the New Zealand Breakers on 13 November, but was struck to the head during the 87–86 overtime loss and was unable to train the following week because of concussion. As a result, he was ruled out of the Wildcats' 17 November game against the Sydney Kings. With Kenny returning to the side, Wroe's minutes decreased significantly averaging 7.14 minutes upon his return between rounds 8 and 14. The Wildcats finished the regular season in third place with a 15–13 record. They defeated the Cairns Taipans 2–0 in the semi-finals and then took out the championship with a 3–0 victory over the Illawarra Hawks in the grand final series. He appeared in 16 of the team's 33 games in 2016–17, averaging 1.3 points, 1.1 rebounds and 0.8 assists in 9.8 minutes per game.

Stirling/Warwick Senators (2016–present)

On 15 January 2016, Wroe signed with the Stirling Senators of the State Basketball League (SBL). He scored a season-high 25 points on 18 June against the Goldfields Giants. The Senators finished the regular season in sixth place with a 17–9 record, and faced the Willetton Tigers in the quarter-finals, where they were defeated 2–0. In 22 games for the Senators in 2016, Wroe averaged 9.8 points, 3.6 rebounds, 4.9 assists and 1.3 steals per game.

Wroe re-joined to the Senators for the 2017 season. He scored 20 points in the season opener on 17 March against the Perry Lakes Hawks. On 15 July, he scored a season-high 23 points in a 105–95 win over the South West Slammers. The Senators finished the regular season in sixth place with a 15–11 record, and faced the Geraldton Buccaneers in the quarter-finals, where they were defeated 2–1. In 26 games for the Senators in 2017, Wroe averaged 11.2 points, 4.5 rebounds and 4.5 assists per game.

Wroe re-joined the Senators as team captain for the 2018 season. On 25 March, he had 13 assists in a 120–111 win over the Willetton Tigers. Wroe missed time mid-season with an ankle injury. The Senators finished the regular season in sixth place for the third straight year with a 14–12 record. In the first game of the quarter-finals against the Perth Redbacks, Wroe had a season-high 16 points with 10 assists in a 114–109 loss. They went on to defeat the Redbacks in three games before being swept by the Joondalup Wolves in the semi-finals. In 26 games for the Senators in 2018, Wroe averaged 7.3 points, 4.0 rebounds, 6.5 assists and 1.4 steals per game.

The club was renamed Warwick Senators in 2019 but Wroe sat out the season. He returned to the Senators for the 2020 season but the COVID-19 pandemic forced the cancellation of the SBL season. Wroe later joined the Senators in July 2020 for the West Coast Classic. He helped the Senators reach the grand final of the West Coast Classic, where they defeated the Perry Lakes Hawks 96–81 behind Wroe's MVP performance of 15 points, six rebounds and six assists.

In December 2020, Wroe re-signed with the Senators for the 2021 NBL1 West season. He sustained an injury in round 9 and did not play again during the season. In eight games, he averaged 7.75 points, 4.5 rebounds, 5.12 assists and 1.75 steals per game.

In December 2021, Wroe re-signed with the Senators for the 2022 NBL1 West season. He only played half the season, averaging 8.4 points, 3.5 rebounds, 5.7 assists and 1.3 steals in 10 games.

Personal
Wroe is the son of Michael and Tracey Wroe, and has two siblings, Simon and Breya. His mother has held managerial positions at both the Brisbane Capitals and Townsville Heat.

References

External links

Corban Wroe at hartfordhawks.com
Corban Wroe at washingtonpost.com
Corban Wroe at sportingpulse.com
Corban Wroe at olympics.com.au

"Corban Wroe ready for Perth Wildcats playoffs campaign" at foxsports.com.au
"Senators experience helps Wroe prepare for key Wildcats role" at sbl.asn.au
"Getting to know the Senators" at sbl.asn.au

1992 births
Living people
Australian men's basketball players
Australian expatriate basketball people in the United States
Australian Institute of Sport basketball players
Hartford Hawks men's basketball players
Perth Wildcats players
Point guards
Sportsmen from Queensland
21st-century Australian people